Samrat Mukerji (born 29 May 1970) is an Indian actor who appears in Hindi and Bengali cinema and soap operas.

Family background 

Samrat Mukerji is part of the Mukherjee-Samarth family clan of Bollywood. His paternal grandfather, Sashadhar Mukherjee, was a filmmaker and co-founder of Filmalaya Studios in Amboli, Mumbai. His sister is Sharbani Mukherjee His cousins are actresses Kajol, Rani Mukerji and Tanisha and director Ayan Mukerji.

Career 
Samrat debuted in the film Ram Aur Shyam with Manek Bedi.  The following year he played the role of Akbar in Bhai Bhai (1997) directed by Sikander Bharti. He appeared in the role of Kavita in the Hindi film Zanjeer (1998) alongside Aditya Pancholi and again with Monica Bedi in the film Sikandar Sadak Ka (1999) as well as various other Bengali and Hindi films. 
In 2005 he played the role of Bijju in Vishal Bhardwaj's film The Blue Umbrella.
His more recent credit includes his acclaimed role as freedom fighter, Ganesh Ghosh in Ashutosh Gowariker's film Khelein Hum Jee Jaan Sey (2010) where he appeared alongside Deepika Padukone, Abhishek Bachchan, Sikander Kher and Vishakha Singh.

Filmography

Hindi

Bengali

References 

Living people
Male actors in Tamil cinema
Male actors in Telugu cinema
Indian male film actors
Male actors in Bengali cinema
21st-century Indian male actors
1978 births